The Ružica Meglaj-Rimac Cup is the national women's basketball cup of Croatia. It has been played for since 1992. It is named after Ružica Meglaj-Rimac, a noted Croatian female basketball player.

History

Cup winners

Performance by club
 Including titles in SFR Yugoslavia and Croatia

References

External links

Women's basketball competitions in Croatia
Women's basketball cup competitions in Europe
Recurring sporting events established in 1992
1992 establishments in Croatia